is an anime superhero TV series created by Go Nagai.

Plot
It is 199X A.D. In Kushiro, Hokkaido, the Drago Knights of the Dragon Empire attack. Possessing overwhelming destructive force, they attack the city to awaken their master, the devil god Jashin Drago from the Rock of Sealing he was trapped in. Two hundred years ago, Drago was trapped in the seal by a holy warrior with the tattooed mark of the Liger. Assuming that the warrior is dead, Drago and Empress Zara are free to conquer the Earth using their army of giant biomechanical beasts. Even the Japan Self-Defense Forces are no match for the Drago Knights' awesome power. One of the people fleeing is the protagonist, a milquetoast 12-year-old 6th grader named Ken Taiga. Unbeknownst to the Dragonites, Ken realizes that he is the descendant of the Lion Clan that once summoned Liger. In a burst of anger, Ken's Liger birthmark appears, and he rises his palm into the air, shouting the henshin (transforming) command, "LIGER!" which then covers him in demonic, long-haired biomechanical armor. Ken transforms into Jushin Liger to fight the evil forces of the Dragon Empire.

Characters

Media

Anime
The opening theme , which was performed by Yumi Hiroki, is also wrestler Jushin Thunder Liger's theme song. The song  was also used by Liger on occasion.

Source(s)

Staff and production notes
Airtime: Saturday, 17:30 - 18:00 hrs.
Network: Nagoya TV, TV Asahi
Planning: Sunrise
Planning coordinator: Dynamic Planning
Production: Nagoya TV, Tokyu Agency, Sunrise
Original work: Go Nagai
Work collaboration: Sunrise
Episode Directors: Osamu Sekita, Toshifumi Kawase, Masao Ito
Direction: Norio Kashima
Scenario: Sho Aikawa, Yoshimasa Takahashi, Toshiki Inoue, Yoshiyuki Suga, Hiroyuki Kawasaki
Animation director: Yorihisa Uchida, Masanori Yamada, Joji Kikuchi
Character design: Yorihisa Uchida
Bio Armor design: Yukihiro Makino
Music: Hiromoto Tobisawa
Source(s)

Theme songs
1st Opening theme:  (lyrics by Yoshihiko Ando, composition by Takashi Kudo, arrangement by Tatsumi Yano, song by Yumi Hiroki)
2nd Opening theme:  (lyrics by Yoshihiko Ando, composition by Takashi Kudo, arrangement by Tatsumi Yano, song by Yumi Hiroki)
1st Ending theme: The Fire (lyrics by Yoshihiko Ando, composition by Takashi Kudo, arrangement by Tatsumi Yano, song by Yumi Hiroki)
2nd Ending theme:  (lyrics by Yoshihiko Ando, composition by Takashi Kudo, arrangement by Tatsumi Yano, song by Yumi Hiroki)
Insert song:  (lyrics by Yoshihiko Ando, composition & arrangement by Hiromoto Tobisawa, song by Yumi Hiroki)
Arranged theme: Ikari no Jushin (lyrics by Yoshihiko Ando, composition by Takashi Kudo, arrangement by Kazuo Nobuta, song by MIO) (not used in the original series, but widely available in several music collections)

This was one of the first anime television series to feature two opening and two ending themes, a tendency that has been followed since then by several anime television series. The Ikari no Jushin, besides being still by Japanese wrestler Jushin Liger, has been used by the Hanshin Tigers as the climbing theme of pitcher Hirotaka Egusa. It's one of the anime themes that has been in constant use even after the TV show ended.

Manga
The manga, which was originally published in Kodansha's magazine Comic Bom Bom, was not published in tankōbon format by this company. Instead, it was published by Keibunsha, Daitosha and Daiso Shuppan.

Keibunsha (Keibunsha Comic Han, 1990)

Daitosha (St Comics, 1999)

Daiso Shuppan (Daiso Comic Series, 2002)

Home video
The TV series was released in VHS format by King Records in 1989 and 1990.

Music
The anime has generated the following records and CDs, all of them produced by King Records.

Appearances in other media
The theme Ikari no Jushin appears in both its original and arranged versions in these CD music collections.

Jushin Liger appears in the Wii video game Super Robot Wars NEO, as well as Super Robot Wars Operation Extend for the PSP. In 2020,  the Jushin Liger anime was featured in the mobile game Super Robot Wars X-Ω as part of a special event to celebrate the retirement of Keiichi Yamada, the wrestler who based his gimmick on the series.

Cultural impact

Sports
This anime series inspired the real-life pro-wrestler, Jushin Thunder Liger.

See also
 Jushin Thunder Liger the pro wrestler.
 Jushin Thunder Liger: Fist of Thunder, the 1995 OVT tokusatsu film.

References

External links
 Jushin Liger (anime)  official website at Sunrise Inc.
 Jushin Liger (anime)  official website at Nagoya Broadcasting Network
 Jushin Liger (anime)  DVD-box official website at Geneon Universal Entertainment
 Jushin Liger (manga)  at The World of Go Nagai webpage
 Jushin Liger (manga)  at d/visual

1989 anime television series debuts
1989 manga
Action anime and manga
Go Nagai
Mecha anime and manga
Sunrise (company)
Anime and manga set in Hokkaido
Shōnen manga
Jushin Liger
Extraterrestrials in anime and manga